Kesher Israel may refer to:

Congregation Kesher Israel (Philadelphia), Pennsylvania
Kesher Israel Congregation (Harrisburg, Pennsylvania)
Kesher Israel (Washington, D.C.), also known as the Georgetown Synagogue